Ottaway is a surname. People with that name include:

Cuthbert Ottaway (1850–1878), the first captain of the England football team
Hugh Ottaway (born 1925), prominent British writer on concert music
James Ottaway (1908–1999), British film, television and stage actor
John Ottaway (born 1955), English international lawn bowler
Richard Ottaway (born 1945), British Conservative politician, and Member of Parliament for Croydon South
Scott Ottaway (born 1972), English drummer and percussionist

See also
Ottoway (disambiguation)
Otway (surname)